Lala is the given name of:

 Lala (painter), 1st century BC Ancient Roman painter and sculptor
 Lance Naik Lala (1876–1927), Indian recipient of the Victoria Cross
 Lala Deen Dayal (1844–1905), Indian photographer
 Lala Fazal-ur-Rehman, Pakistani politician, appointed administrator of Karachi District in 2010
 Lala Hansraj Gupta (died 1985), Indian educationist and mayor of Delhi
 Mahatma Hansraj (1864–1938), Indian educationist
 Lala Har Dayal (1884–1939), Indian revolutionary and founder of the Ghadar Party
 Lala Elizabeth Tudor Hassenberg (born 1978), pen name Elizabeth Tudor, Azerbaijani-Russian science fiction writer
 Lala Hsu (born 1984), Taiwanese singer-songwriter
 Lala Karmela (born 1985), Indonesian singer-songwriter
 Lala Ram Ken (1931–2007), Indian politician
 Lala Kramarenko (born 2004), Russian rhythmic gymnast
 Lala Mara (1931–2004), Fijian chief, wife of Kamisese Mara, founding father of modern Fiji
 Lala Meredith-Vula (born 1966), Kosovan artist and photographer
 Lala Mnatsakanyan (born 1957), Armenian actress
 Lala Lajpat Rai (1865–1928), Indian author and politician
 Lala Achint Ram (1898–1961), Indian freedom fighter and politician
 Lala Shri Ram (1884–1963), Indian businessman
 Lala Abdul Rashid (1922–1989), Pakistani field hockey goalkeeper
 Lala Shevket (born 1951), Azerbaijani politician, former Secretary of State of Azerbaijan
 Lala Sloatman (born 1970), American actress and model
 Lala Sukuna (1888–1958), Fijian chief, scholar, soldier and statesman
 Lala Yusifova (born 1996), Azerbaijani retired rhythmic gymnast

Fictional characters
Lala Hagoromo

See also
 Lalla (disambiguation)

Unisex given names